Ardleigh Heath is a hamlet on the B1029 road, in the Tendring District of the county of Essex, England. It is located between Lamb Corner and Dedham (to the north) and Ardleigh (to the south).

History
Ardleigh Heath was formerly called Dedham Heath. It was on the north boundary of Ardleigh parish, and was unenclosed heathland. This was mostly vulnerable to flooding, or the clay soil was difficult to plough. It did, however attract a settlement.

References

External links

Hamlets in Essex
Tendring